Mala Mislinja is a dispersed settlement in the hills north of Mislinja in northern Slovenia. The area is part of the traditional region of Carinthia. The entire Municipality of Mislinja is now included in the Carinthia Statistical Region.

References

External links
Mala Mislinja on Geopedia

Populated places in the Municipality of Mislinja